A list of members of the Løgting from 2004 to 2008. The Løgting had 32 members this period. After 2008 the number of members was 33. The election for the Løgting was held on 20 January 2004. Tjóðveldi (Republic) got 8 members elected, Union Party, Social Democratic Party and People's Party got 7 members elected, Centre Party got 2 members and Self-Government Party got one member elected for the Løgting.

References

External links
Current members of the Løgting

 2008
2004 in the Faroe Islands
2005 in the Faroe Islands
2006 in the Faroe Islands
2007 in the Faroe Islands
2008 in the Faroe Islands
2004–2008